Kira is a mostly feminine name of multiple origins and meanings.

It might be a feminine form of the name Kiran, pronounced  . Kiran is of Hindi and Sanskrit origin, meaning "beam of light". In Ancient Hebrew "Keren" means both "a horn" and "a beam of light". Besides Sanskrit and Hebrew there might be other etymologies from Egyptian, where the word Ki-Ra means "like Ra", or Persian. Due to the Greek interpretation of the Persian king's name Kourosh (کوروش, Kūrosh) as Κύρος (Kýros) – which was obviously modeled after the Greek word κύριος (kýrios "lord"), the feminine form being κυρία (kyría) – Kyra (or Kira) can also be understood as a variant. Therefore, it is also in use as a feminine form of the Greek diminutive form Cyril.

In Russian Kira is the feminine form of the masculine name Kir, meaning "mistress, ruler", but can translate to "leader of the people", "one the people look to" or "beloved". Kira could also have arrived into Russian from the Persian-Greek name Kyra. Kira can also be the diminutive of the old and rare masculine given name Avvakir.

Kira is one of several Anglicized forms of the Irish name Ciara, which in Irish means "dark haired".

Kira also means "Strong Woman" in Slavonic. 

There is also a Japanese name, romanized as Kira, which is common in Japan, as both given name and family name (e.g. the Kira clan of Mikawa province). Kira kira also means "glittery, shiny" in Japanese.

Variant forms include Kaira, Keera, Keira, Kiera, Kyra, Kyrah, Kyreena, Kyrha, Kyria, Kyrie, Kyrene, Kyrra, and Kirra.

People 
 Kira Banasińska (1899-2002), Polish humanitarian
 Kira Bertrand (born 1992), Dominican-Canadian footballer
 Kira Bilecky (born 1986), American-Peruvian footballer
 Kira Bousloff (1914-2001), Russian-Australian dancer
 Kira Brunton (born 1999), Canadian curler
 Kira Buckland (born 1987), American voice actress
 Kira Bulten (born 1973), Dutch Olympic swimmer
 Kira Bursky, American filmmaker 
 Kira Carstensen, American documentary filmmaker
 Kira Chathli (born 1999), English cricketer
 Kira Chikazane (1563-1588), Japanese senior retainer
 Kira Cochrane (born 1977), British journalist
 Kira Davis, American film producer
 Kira Danganan-Azucena, Filipino diplomat 
 Kira Eggers (born 1974), Danish model
 Kira Geil (born 1985), Austrian ice dancer
 Kira Golovko (1919–2017), Russian actress
 Kira Nam Greene, Korean-American painter
 Kira Grünberg (born 1993), Austrian politician
 Kira Hagi (born 1996), Romanian actress
 Kira Hall (born 1962), American anthropologist
 Kira Lynn Harris (born 1963), American artist
 Kira Henehan (born 1974), American author
 Kira Horn (born 1995), German field hockey player
 Kira Hurley (born 1986), Canadian professional ice hockey player
 Kira Inugami, Japanese manga artist
 Kira Isabella (born 1993), Canadian country music artist
 Kira Ivanova (1963–2001), Russian figure skater
 Kira Jääskeläinen (born 1979), Polish film director
 Kira Kattenbeck (born 1992), German badminton player
 Kira Kazantsev (born 1991), Russian-American beauty queen 
 Kira Kelly, American cinematographer
 Kiira Korpi, Finnish skater (Kiira is a Finnish variant of the name)
 Kira Kosarin (born 1997), American actress
 Kira Kovalenko (born 1989), Russian film director
 Kira Kreylis-Petrova (1931–2021), Russian theater actress
 Kira Lewis Jr. (born 2001), American basketball player
 Kira Lipperheide (born 2000), German bobsledder
 Kira Makarova, Estonian-American researcher
 Kira Maria, Bulgarian empress consort
 Kira Miró (born 1980), Spanish actress and a presenter
 Kira Mozgalova (born 1982), Russian Olympic athlete
 Kira Muratova (born 1934), Soviet and Ukrainian film director, screenwriter, and actress
 Kira Nagy (born 1977), Hungarian tennis player
 Kira Narayanan (born 1994), Indian film actress
Kira Obolensky, American playwright and author
 Kira O'Reilly, British performance artist
 Kira Peikoff (born 1985), American journalist
 Kira Marie Peter-Hansen (born 1998), Danish politician
 Kira Phillips (born 1995), Australian rules footballer
 Kira Peikoff (born 1985), American journalist and novelist
 Kira Plastinina (born 1992), Russian fashion designer
 Kira Poutanen (born 1974), Finnish writer and actress
 Kira Borisovna Povarova (born 1933), Russian professor
 Kira Puru, Australian musician
 Kira Radinsky (born 1986), Israeli computer scientist
 Kira Reed (born 1971), American actress
 Kira Roessler (born 1962), American musician
 Grand Duchess Kira Kirillovna of Russia (1909–1967), Russian grand duchess
 Kira Rudik (born 1985), Ukrainian politician
 Princess Kira of Prussia (1943–2004)
 Kira Salak (born 1971), American writer
 Kira Shashkina, Russian pianist
 Kira Simon-Kennedy, American film producer
 Kira Skov (born 1976), Danish singer
 Kira Soltanovich (born 1973), Ukrainian comedian
 Kira Stepanova (born 1993), Russian Olympic athlete
 Kira Sugiyama (1910–1988), Japanese photographer
 Kira Thurman, African-American historian
 Kira Toussaint (born 1994), Dutch swimmer
 Kira Tozer (born 1984), Canadian voice actress
 Kira Trusova (born 1994), Russian handball player
 Kira Vincent-Davis (born 1979), American voice actress
 Kira Walkenhorst (born 1990), German beach volleyball player
 Kira Weidle (born 1996), German alpine skier
 Kira Willey, American musician
 Kira Yarmysh (born 1989), Russian writer
 Kira Yoshinaka (1641-1703), Japanese politician
 Kira Zvorykina (1919–2014), Soviet and Ukrainian chess player

Fictional characters 
 Kira Argounova, the protagonist in Ayn Rand's We the Living
 Kira Aso, female protagonist in the Japanese manga Mars
 Kira Carsen in the video game Star Wars: The Old Republic
 Kira Daidohji in the video game series Arcana Heart
 Kira Finster in the Nickelodeon animated television series Rugrats and its spin-off All Grown Up!
 Kira Ford (aka Yellow Dino Ranger) in Power Rangers: Dino Thunder
 Kyra Hart in the WB/CW television series Reba, played by Scarlett Pomers
 Kira Marlowe in the television drama Flashpoint, constable, Special Response Unit dispatcher, played by Pascale Hutton
 Kira Sakuratsuki in the anime Futakoi
 Sumeragi Kira in the anime Uta no Prince-Sama
 Kira Supernova, in the 2013 computer-animated film Escape from Planet Earth, voiced by Sarah Jessica Parker
 Kira Yamato in the Japanese anime television series Mobile Suit Gundam SEED and Mobile Suit Gundam SEED Destiny
Kira Yoshikage in the Japanese anime television series JoJo's Bizarre Adventure
 Kira Yukimura, one of the main characters in the MTV drama Teen Wolf
 Kira (Death Note), alias of the protagonist Light Yagami in the Japanese manga/anime franchise Death Note
 Kira (Gelfling) in the film The Dark Crystal
 Kira (Iggy Arbuckle), a anthropomorphic rat in the Canadian animated television series Iggy Arbuckle
 Kira (Mortal Kombat)
 Kira Nerys in the Star Trek Deep Space 9 television series
 Kira the Seer in the Charmed television series universe
 Kira, a recurring character and antagonist in season 3 of Disney Channel's Andi Mack
 Kira, the main character of the book Gathering Blue by Lois Lowry
 Kira, daughter of Sarah Manning in the Canadian sci-fi television series Orphan Black
 Kira in the animated preschool television series Zack & Quack
 Kira in the 1980 film Xanadu, played by Olivia Newton-John
 Kira Yoshikage, the main antagonist of JoJo's Bizarre Adventure: Diamond is Unbreakable by Hirohiko Araki
 Kira Navárez, the main character of the 2020 sci-fi novel To Sleep in a Sea of Stars
 Kira King, one of the main characters of the 2022 Disney+ original movie Sneakerella

See also
Keira (given name)
Kiera
Kiran
Kyra (given name)

References 

Belarusian feminine given names
English feminine given names
Japanese feminine given names
Persian feminine given names
Russian feminine given names
Ukrainian feminine given names